Thirtynine Mile Mountain, elevation , is a summit in the Front Range of the Pike National Forest in central Colorado.

See also

List of Colorado mountain summits
List of Colorado county high points

References

External links

Mountains of Colorado
Mountains of Park County, Colorado
North American 3000 m summits